The chairman of the government of the Russian Federation, also informally known as the prime minister, is the head of government of Russia. Although the post dates back to 1905, its current form was established on 12 December 1993 following the introduction of a new constitution.

Due to the central role of the president of Russia in the political system, the activities of the executive branch (including the prime minister) are significantly influenced by the head of state (for example, it is the president who appoints and dismisses the prime minister and other members of the government; the president may chair the meetings of the cabinet and give obligatory orders to the prime minister and other members of the government; the president may also revoke any act of the government). The use of the term prime minister is strictly informal and is never used in the constitution.

Mikhail Mishustin is the current prime minister. He was appointed on 16 January 2020 after Dmitry Medvedev and the rest of the government resigned the previous day.

Historical background

Imperial period

Early Russian prime ministers 

Until 1905, the head of government was the emperor. In the absence of the emperor, the ministers one by one, starting with the oldest in the rank, each acted as head of government for four sessions.

In 1810, the chairpersonship was granted to the state chancellor, Count Nikolay Rumyantsev, the former then chairperson of the State Council. Since 1812, as chairperson of the committee has evolved into an independent position, which until 1865 necessarily coincide with the presidency of the Council of State.

Traditionally, the chairpersonship of the committee was last in the public service honorary position appointed by the dignitaries that have become too old to execution of the duties of the minister. A number of committee chairmen (especially duke Alexander Chernyshyov, count Alexey F. Orlov, count Dmitry Bludov) was characterized by contemporaries as "barely alive", "miserable". Count Modest Korf jokingly wrote about count Chernyshov: "Look, just live!" Duke Pavel Gagarin died in office at the age of 83 years.

1905–1917 

The modern post of prime minister appeared in 1905. A decree of Emperor Nicholas II on 19 October 1905 established the Council of Ministers of the Russian Empire, bringing together the Ministers in one Cabinet (previously each Minister had reported directly to the Emperor on the affairs of their department). The Chairperson of the Council of Ministers officially became a fully-fledged head of government. Nicholas appointed Graf Sergei Witte as his first "prime minister".

From 1905 the prime minister received extensive powers, with the opportunity to pursue their own policies and reforms. Pyotr Stolypin (in office: 1906–1911) gained a reputation as one of the strongest prime ministers - during his premiership he made several major (though controversial) reforms.

Though the Russian Constitution of 1906 established the State Duma (a representative house of parliament), the Government was not responsible to it. Although Sergei Witte and Pyotr Stolypin (at the beginning of his Premiership) each tried to form a coalition government of the largest political organizations, they did not succeed. The State Duma nevertheless tried to gain influence over the government. Conflict between the State Duma and the government became particularly evident during the first Premiership of Ivan Goremykin in 1906.

The position of Chairperson of the Council of Ministers of the Russian Empire lasted 12 years; during this time seven people took this post (one twice).

Provisional Government 

During the Russian Provisional Government, the prime minister de facto headed the Russian state and was officially called the “Minister-Chairperson of the Russian Provisional Government". This position was held by only two people, Georgy Lvov and Alexander Kerensky.

The position lasted about six months, and after the October Revolution, was replaced by Chairperson of the Council of People's Commissars of the Russian SFSR.

Soviet period 
During the reign of Vladimir Lenin, the Chairperson of the Council of People's Commissars was the de facto leader of the RSFSR (from 1922 to 1991).

In 1946, the post of head of government was renamed Chairperson of the Council of Ministers. People who held those positions are sometimes referred to as the prime ministers. They may have also been referred to as premier of ministers, or simply premier.

Post-Soviet period 

Currently, the formal title of the prime minister is "Chairperson of the Government of the Russian Federation".

In modern Russia, the prime minister is appointed by the president, with the consent of the State Duma. The prime minister is responsible to the president and regularly reports to them, however, they only report to the State Duma once a year.

After the election of Boris Yeltsin, President of Russia, the head of the government was Yeltsin himself. He headed the Russian SFSR Government (16 May 1992, the Government of the Russian Federation) for about six months. In fact, Yeltsin was the first Head of Government of Russia after the dissolution of the Soviet Union; however, he was not the prime minister. After Yeltsin, Yegor Gaidar became acting prime minister, but the Russian Supreme Soviet refused to approve him as prime minister. On 14 December 1992, the prime minister appointed was Viktor Chernomyrdin.

The Russian political system is similar to the modern French system. For the appointment of the prime minister the president needs a majority in the state Duma. If the party president does not have the majority and fails to form a coalition, the president may need to appoint a loyalist to the position of prime minister. For example, this occurred in 1998 when the state Duma (which had most of the opposition to the president of the party) twice refused to appoint Prime Minister Viktor Chernomyrdin, and Boris Yeltsin appointed Prime Minister Yevgeny Primakov, who supported the left opposition.

In the mid-1990s in Russia there was a term "technical prime minister". This term refers to the prime minister, who is not an independent political figure, is only the nominal head of government, and in fact the activities of the government are headed by the president.

Duties and competences

In general, the prime minister serves more of an administrative role, nominating members of the Cabinet and taking the lead in fully implementing domestic and foreign policy as formulated by the president. In accordance with the federal constitutional law "On the Government of the Russian Federation" the prime minister exercises the following duties:

 determines the operating priorities of the government and organizes its work in accordance with the Constitution, federal constitutional laws, federal laws and presidential decrees, aside from running the day-to-day affairs of the government, in general.
 submits to the president proposals on the structure and functions of the central institutions of the executive branch (e.g. ministries and federal agencies);
 nominates the vice prime ministers, federal ministers and other officers and presents them to the president;
 submits to the president proposals on punishment and rewards of the government members;
 represents the government as an institution in foreign relations and inside the country;
 heads the sessions of the government and its Presidium where he has the decisive vote;
 signs the acts of the government;
 report annually to the State Duma about the government activities;
 distributes duties among members of the government;
 systematically informs the president about the government activities;

The prime minister is ex officio a member of:

 The Security Council of the Russian Federation;
 The Council of the Heads of Government of the Commonwealth of Independent States;
 The Supreme State Council of the Union State of Russia and Belarus;
 The Council of the Heads of Government of the Shanghai Cooperation Organization;
 The Interstate Council of the Eurasian Economic Community (EurAsEC);

Appointment

Initially, the prime minister was appointed by the Emperor of Russia, without the consent of the candidate to the State Duma.

In Soviet times, the prime minister of the Russian SFSR was appointed by the Supreme Council after each election.

Currently the prime minister is appointed by the president of Russia, subject to the consent of the State Duma (before 1993 the Supreme Soviet). Unlike most other "prime ministers", who are also elected members of the legislative body or parliament, the Chairperson of the Government of Russia can be any Russian citizen, as long as they do not also hold citizenship of another country.

Under law, the president shall nominate a new Chairperson of the Government within two weeks of the resignation of a previous government or inauguration ceremony of president. The State Duma is to discuss the matter within two weeks of the nomination and make a decision. The procedure of granting consent by the parliament is usually preceded by several days of comprehensive consultations and interviews of the candidate by the parliamentary factions. Should the State Duma decide to give the president its approval, the president may immediately sign the respective appointment decree. Should the State Duma refuse to give its approval, the president will have to nominate another (or the same) candidate within one week of the rejection of the previous candidate.

Should the State Duma reject candidates nominated by the president for three times consecutively, the president shall dissolve it and call a new election, while the prime minister shall be appointed by the president without participation of the Duma. The State Duma may not be dissolved on these grounds during the first year after parliamentary elections, the last six months of the incumbent president's term, as well as in time of emergency, or war and in the event that the State Duma has initiated the impeachment of the incumbent president.

Results of confirmations voting

Removal from office
The prime minister may be dismissed by the president at any time at the president's discretion. The prime minister may also tender their resignation to the president on their own initiative. The president may reject such resignation and oblige them to continue their work. The prime minister and the whole government are constitutionally obliged to resign after the inauguration of a newly elected president. At the same time, the president has the right to dismiss both the entire government together with the prime minister, and only prime minister, retaining the government.

Under certain circumstances, the president may also theoretically be forced to dismiss the chairperson and the whole government under the pressure of the State Duma. For that to happen, the State Duma has to pass a censure motion against the government twice within three months. Normally, in this case the president has the right to choose whether to sack the government or to dissolve the Duma (and if the Duma passes the censure motion just once, the president may also choose "not to agree" with the decision of the Duma, which technically means that neither the cabinet nor the Duma are dismissed).

However, within one year after parliamentary elections the dissolution of the State Duma is impossible on these grounds. That is why in this case the president does not have any other option but to dismiss the government (even if they totally support it).

Term of office
Initially, the term of office of the prime minister was not formally established. The head of the government served in their post for as long as the Emperor thought necessary.

In Soviet times, the term of the prime minister was also unlimited. The Chairperson Council of Ministers of the Russian SFSR served in the position until he was dismissed by the General Secretary of the Communist Party of the Soviet Union.

A term limit was introduced after the creation of the post of the president of Russia. Government became subordinate to the president, so the prime minister must resign along with the president, but may be appointed again. From 1991 to 1996, the maximum term of office of the prime minister was 5 years. After the new Constitution of Russia was created, the term of office of the president, and therefore the term of office of the prime minister, was shortened to 4 years. In 2012, after amendments to the Constitution the term of the president and prime minister was increased to 6 years.

Acting prime minister

Temporary absence
The Federal constitutional law "On the Government of the Russian Federation" says "in the case of temporary absence of the Chairperson of the Government of the Russian Federation, their duties are performed by one of the deputy chairmen of the Government of the Russian Federation in accordance with a written distribution of responsibilities". It's automatically and President's Executive Order is not required in that moment. The Federal constitutional law "On the Government of the Russian Federation" does not limit the term of "temporary absence" of the prime minister and the term of work of the acting prime minister.

There can be more than one First Deputy Prime Minister of Russia, therefore written distribution of responsibilities is the most important document. The office of First Vice-Premier is not provisioned by Constitution and it is not separate office. The Chapter 6 of the Constitution of Russia says, that "The Government of the Russian Federation consists of the Chairperson of the Government of the Russian Federation, Deputy Chairperson of the Government of the Russian Federation and federal ministries".

When the whole of government resigned
The prime minister can leave their post at their own request or if it is impossible for them to exercise their powers. The Federal constitutional law "On the Government of the Russian Federation" says that the dismissal of the prime minister entails the resignation of the entire government. If the prime minister resigns, the president has the right to delegate their duties to one of their Vice-premiers. This situation cannot continue for more than two months – this period is reserved for the head of state to select a candidate for a new prime minister and submit it to The state Duma.

Very often, the acting prime minister later proposed the State Duma as the new prime minister.

Succession of the presidency

In case of the president's death, resignation or impeachment, the prime minister becomes a temporary president until new presidential elections which must take place within three months. The prime minister as acting president may not dissolve the State Duma, announce a referendum or propose amendments to the Constitution.

The Russian Constitution does not explicitly specify who should become acting president if the prime minister is not appointed or is unable to perform his or her duties. Some believe that in the case of incapacity of the president and prime minister, the chairman of the Federation Council should become acting head of state. However, nowhere in the legislation is this fixed.

List of prime ministers of Russia 

Approximately 99 people have been head of the Russian government since its establishment in 1726. The chairperson of government was a member of the Supreme Privy Council, which was created on 8 (19) February 1726 by Empress Catherine, and from 8 (20) September 1802 ministerial duties were allocated by the Committee of Ministers, which was established on in accordance with the proclamation of Emperor Alexander II. Beginning with Count Aleksandr Romanovich Vorontsov, the eldest of the officers was de facto chairperson of the committee. Eight years after the inauguration of the manifest, the first de jure office holder was Count Nikolay Rumyantsev. The Council of Ministers was unofficially formed in October 1857, as a result of Emperor Alexander II's reforms; its first session began on 19 (31) December 1857. Before the actual formation of that body on 12 (24) November 1861, the Emperor himself was in charge. The Council of Ministers consisted of chairperson of the State Council and the Committee of Ministers, as well as high-ranking officers appointed by the Emperor. The first session ended on 11 (23) December 1882, after the number of files to the Council greatly decreased.

The Committee of Ministers functioned simultaneously with the second session of the Council of Ministers for six more months; Count Sergei Witte participated on both entities until the abolition of the committee on 23 April (5 May) 1906. Following that event, the duties of the committee were left to the Council of Ministers, until the formation of the Small Council in 1909, which also included deputy ministers. By the order of Emperor Nicholas II, the second session of the Council of Ministers began on 19 October (1 November) 1905, following the formation of the State Duma. Shortly after the February Revolution and the inception of the Russian Provisional Government on 2 (15) March 1917, Georgy Lvov from the Constitutional Democratic Party and Alexander Kerensky from the Socialist Revolutionary Party became joint Minister-Chairmen. The provisional Russian Republic was eventually replaced by the Russian Soviet Federative Socialist Republic (RSFSR) and the governmental body by the Council of People's Commissars, which was chaired from 1917 to 1924 by Vladimir Lenin. That body was renamed Council of Ministers following a decree of the Supreme Council on 23 March 1946.

After the fall of the Soviet Union, Boris Yeltsin, as the President of the Russian Federation, was automatically appointed as the Head of Government of the Russian Federation in the first two years of his mandate. The latter body took the previous name "Council of Ministers", the chairperson of which became Viktor Chernomyrdin, replacing acting chairperson Yegor Gaidar. According to the new constitution ratified on 25 December 1993, those two entities were separated. Since then, the head of that office takes the formal title "Chairmen of the Government" or colloquially "Prime Minister" (the only actual prime minister was Valentin Pavlov). Chernomyrdin resumed chairing the government, followed up by non-partisans and acting office holders. On 8 May 2008, Vladimir Putin took the office for a second term, now as a member of United Russia. Current Prime Minister Mikhail Mishustin took the office on 16 January 2020.

The youngest head of government by his accession to office was Count Karl-Fridrikh Golshteyn-Gottorpsky, at age 26, and the oldest Count Pyotr Andreyevich Tolstoy, at age 81.

List below includes Prime Ministers since 1991

Living former prime ministers

The most recent death of a former prime minister was that of Ivan Silayev (1930–2023) on 8 February 2023, aged 92.

Notes

References

External links
 Official Website of the Prime Minister of Russia 
 Official Site of the Government of Russia 

 
Government of Russia

1905 establishments in the Russian Empire